Anneika Rose is a Scottish stage and television actress known for Line of Duty, Shetland, Ackley Bridge and Deadwater Fell.

Early life
Rose has family from Sri Lanka. She was born and grew up in Glasgow, the second oldest of six children. Rose trained at the Royal Scottish Academy of Music and Drama.

Career
Rose has appeared on many UK television shows including Shetland, The Midwich Cuckoos, Line of Duty, Deadwater Fell and Ackley Bridge. She also appeared in successful theatre productions of Romeo And Juliet, Behind The Beautiful Forevers and The Empress. Indeed, such was her string of hits in a short space of time The Sunday Post said that her “name on the credits seems to signal a jewel in the television schedules and theatre listings.” Rose told the paper “I think I am fortunate, I have to say. I’m drawn to scripts that are gripping. It’s a good sign if I start reading a script, and I want to keep reading….All of those TV shows, they all had great scripts, it was the main draw.” Rose has also been able to work with a number of high-profile Scottish actors, from David Tennant (Deadwater Fell), Mark Bonnar (Guilt) and Kelly MacDonald (Line of Duty). She also appeared in The Cry which The National called “the best TV drama Scotland has ever produced”.

Partial filmography

Partial theatre work

References

External links
 

21st-century Scottish actresses
British actresses of South Asian descent
Scottish actresses
Actresses from Glasgow
Alumni of the Royal Conservatoire of Scotland
Scottish people of Sri Lankan descent

Living people

Year of birth missing (living people)